The International Orienteering Federation (IOF) is the international governing body of the sport of orienteering.  The IOF head office is located in Karlstad, Sweden. The IOF governs four orienteering disciplines: foot orienteering, mountain bike orienteering, ski orienteering, and trail orienteering.

After the 2022 Russian invasion of Ukraine, the International Orienteering Federation suspended the membership of the Russian Orienteering Federation. The IOF also disallowed Russian orienteering athletes from participating in IOF events, even as neutral athletes, cancelled all organising rights for IOF events and activities in Russia, and suspended all Russian members appointed to IOF official bodies.

History
The IOF was founded on 21 May 1961 at a Congress held in Copenhagen, Denmark by the orienteering national federations of Bulgaria, Czechoslovakia, Denmark, the Federal Republic of Germany, the German Democratic Republic, Finland, Hungary, Norway, Sweden and Switzerland. By 1969, the IOF represented 16 countries, including its first two non-European member federations representing Japan and Canada, and in 1977 the IOF was recognised by the International Olympic Committee.

After the 2022 Russian invasion of Ukraine, the International Orienteering Federation suspended the membership of the Russian Orienteering Federation. The IOF also disallowed Russian orienteering athletes from participating in IOF events, even as neutral athletes, cancelled all organising rights for IOF events and activities in Russia, and suspended all Russian members appointed to IOF official bodies.

Membership

As of January 2016, the membership of the IOF comprised 80 national orienteering federations, of which 56 were members, 24 were provisional members, divided into six geographical regions.

Africa 
6 Members, 1 Provisional Member

Asia 
17 Members, 1 Provisional Member

Europe 
40 Members

North America 
5 Members

Oceania 
2 Members

South America 
9 Members

Governance structure
The IOF is governed by an elected Council consisting of a President, a Senior Vice President, two Vice Presidents, and seven other Council members.  Day-to-day operations of the IOF are the responsibility of the IOF Secretary General.  Several standing commissions of the IOF are responsible for the development of the sport worldwide.  These commissions include: Foot Orienteering, MTB Orienteering, Ski Orienteering, Trail Orienteering, Environment, IT, Map, Medical, and Rules.

Presidents
 Erik Tobé (1961—1975)
 Lasse Heideman (1975—1982)
 Bengt Saltin (1982—1988)
 Heinz Tschudin (1988—1994)
 Sue Harvey (1994—2004)
 Åke Jacobson (2004—2012)
 Brian Porteous (2012—2016)
 Leho Haldna (2016—)

Affiliations
Since 1977, the IOF has been recognised by the International Olympic Committee.

The IOF is also a member of the following organisations:

Association of IOC Recognised International Sports Federations (ARISF)
International World Games Association (IWGA)
International Masters Games Association (IMGA)
SportAccord

Publications
The IOF publishes a wide variety of journals and reference works related to the sport.  These include Orienteering World, an annual magazine, The Scientific Journal of Orienteering, the OZine, and official editions of the rules of IOF sanctioned orienteering and specifications for orienteering maps.

References

 
International sports organizations
IOC-recognised international federations
Orienteering
Orienteering in Sweden
Outdoor recreation organizations
Sport in Karlstad
Sports governing bodies in Sweden
Sports organizations established in 1961
1961 establishments in Denmark